{{Album ratings
| MC = 74/100 link
|rev1=AllMusic
|rev1score=  [ link]
|rev2=Drowned in Sound
|rev2score= 7/10 link
|rev3=Gigwise
|rev3score= link
|rev4=Harp
|rev4score=(positive) link
|rev5=IGN
|rev5score=9.4/10 link
|rev6=Rolling Stone
|rev6score=  link
|rev7=Pitchfork|rev7score=5.5/10 link
|rev8=This Is Fake DIY
|rev8Score=  link
|rev9=URB|rev9score= link
|rev10=Yahoo! Music
|rev10score= link
}}Ben Kweller is the third album by Ben Kweller. It was released September 19, 2006 on ATO Records.

One Minute Pop Song
For the 9 weeks leading up to the release of the album Ben Kweller previously took footage of himself and made an internet mini-show called One Minute Pop Song. Each episode would usually run for 2–6 minutes.

Topics of the videos were varied. Some of the topics were about a fan who sent in a cover version of a song, talking about laying down the tracks and playing all the instruments on the album, showing a tour of the studio, Ben Kweller rating himself on each instrument, telling a story about Neil Young, and talking about how he learned to play the drums from his father.

Recording process
On his MySpace website, Kweller described the making of the album as "very exciting, emotional and challenging." He explained that since he played all the instruments on the album it "was a big change for me and it produced something really intimate and special. It's such a different way of working but if you can pull it off it makes a very cool and unique sound." He also described a song on the album, "A bonus for me, and you, is I think I might have written my best song while I was in the studio. It's called 'Thirteen'. It's very personal and almost hard for me to listen to."

"This Is War" off the album is featured in the 2011 film Diary of a Wimpy Kid: Rodrick Rules''.

Track listing
All songs and instruments by Ben Kweller.
"Run" – 3:07
"Nothing Happening" – 3:53
"Sundress" – 4:06
"I Gotta Move" – 3:10
"Thirteen" – 4:17
"Penny on the Train Track" – 4:28
"I Don't Know Why" – 3:06
"Magic" – 3:08
"Red Eye" – 4:20
"Until I Die" – 4:07
"This Is War" – 2:25

Personnel
 Matt Boynton – digital editing
 Adrian Bushby – mixing
 Brian Dawson – live sound engineer
 John Dunne – engineer
 Roger Greenawalt – demo engineer
 Sam Kersherbaum – photography
 Ben Kweller – art direction, design, photography, layout design, instrumentation
 Ray Lego – photography, cover photo
 Steve Mazur – engineer
 Sarah McGoldrick – design, layout design
 Gil Norton – producer, mixing, pre-production
 Michael Palmieri – photography
 Brian Thom – engineer
 Elizabeth Weinberg – photography
 Richard Woodcraft – engineer

Charts

References

Ben Kweller
Ben Kweller albums
Albums produced by Gil Norton
ATO Records albums